Laura Granville and Lucie Hradecká were the defending champions, however Granville did not participate. Lucie Hradecká partnered up with Marina Erakovic and lost in the first round to Beatrice Capra and Coco Vandeweghe

The doubles final was scratched and Jamie Hampton and Anna Tatishvili were awarded a “walkover” defeat of Irina Falconi and Alison Riske as Riske withdrew due to illness. As a result, Hampton and Tatishvili split the $5,573 first place prize, while Falconi and Riske forfeited their prize to the United States Tennis Association. Riske was awarded the tournament's Sportsmanship Award with her withdrawal cited as one of the reasons for the award.

Seeds

Draw

Finals

References

External Links
 Main Draw

Dow Corning Tennis Classic - Doubles
Dow Corning Tennis Classic